The 1995 Copa Interamericana was the 17th. edition of the Copa Interamericana. The final took place between Costa Rican club Deportivo Saprissa (winner of 1995 CONCACAF Champions' Cup) and Colombian side Atlético Nacional (1995 Copa Libertadores runner-up so current champion Grêmio declined to participate.

Unlike previous editions, the final was staged over just one match, being held on April 3, 1997 in San José, Costa Rica. Atlético Nacional beat Saprissa 3–2, winning their second Copa Interamericana trophy. Furthermore, they are the only team from Colombia to have win the competition.

Qualified teams

Match details

References

Copa Interamericana
i
i
i
International club association football competitions hosted by Colombia
International club association football competitions hosted by Costa Rica
i
i